Joseph H. "Joe" Hutchinson (May 21, 1864 – September 5, 1930) was a Democratic politician from Idaho. He served as the sixth lieutenant governor of Idaho. Hutchinson was elected in 1899 along with Governor Frank Steunenberg. He died in 1930 after a short illness.

References

1860 births
1934 deaths
Idaho Democrats
Lieutenant Governors of Idaho
People from Central City, Colorado